Tino Lagator (born 14 September 1987) is a Croatian football player who currently plays for SV Hummetroth in Germany. He previously played for NK Dugopolje in the Druga HNL.

References

External links 
HLSZ
Tino Lagator at HKFA
Tino Lagator at Fupa

1987 births
Living people
People from Sinj
Association football forwards
Croatian footballers
NK Hrvace players
NK Dugopolje players
NK Junak Sinj players
TuS Koblenz players
FK Atlantas players
Lombard-Pápa TFC footballers
NK Solin players
Happy Valley AA players
Citizen AA players
SC Hessen Dreieich players
A Lyga players
Nemzeti Bajnokság I players
First Football League (Croatia) players
Hong Kong First Division League players
Hessenliga players
Croatian expatriate footballers
Expatriate footballers in Germany
Expatriate footballers in Lithuania
Expatriate footballers in Hungary
Croatian expatriate sportspeople in Germany
Croatian expatriate sportspeople in Lithuania
Croatian expatriate sportspeople in Hungary
Expatriate footballers in Hong Kong
Croatian expatriate sportspeople in Hong Kong